The Atlanta Central Library in Downtown Atlanta is the main library and headquarters of the Atlanta–Fulton Public Library System. The library, built from 1977 to 1980, has a Brutalist design by architect Marcel Breuer – his last work, and his only work in Atlanta. The building was partially renovated in 2002, and a complete renovation took place from 2018 to 2021, following a 2016 vote against demolishing the structure.

History

Prior building

On March 4, 1902, the first public library, the Carnegie Library, opened on the site of the current Central Library. When the library opened, only the basement, the stacks, and the children's room were completed. The Carnegie Library remained the main library of the system for most of the century. The library was renovated in 1950 and 1966 through city bond funding. Before 1950 the system was referred to as the Carnegie Library, but to commemorate the renovation of the central Carnegie Library the system was renamed the Atlanta Public Library in 1950. It was in this building that 20 gay men were arrested following a police stakeout in September 1953, an event known as the Atlanta Public Library perversion case. In 1977 the Carnegie Library was torn down to make way for the current Central Library. However, the building's architectural bays were preserved, and used to create the Carnegie Education Pavilion, a monument to higher education in Atlanta.

Breuer building
Completed in 1980, it was the last building to be designed by Bauhaus-movement architect Marcel Breuer. The building, designed in the Brutalist architectural style, was once considered a masterpiece by architectural experts, such as Barry Bergdoll, the Chief Architectural Curator of the Museum of Modern Art, and is closely related to Breuer's Whitney Museum of Art building. Breuer was unable to attend the dedication ceremonies on May 25, 1980, and he died a year later on July 1, 1981, at the age of 79.

The concept for the design dates back to 1969, but the contract was not awarded to Breuer until 1976, because of disputes between the library administration and city government over the bond referendum needed to raise the $18.9 million for construction of the library. Construction began in 1977, and when the structure was completed in 1980 it featured a 300-seat theater, six stories of library space, and a restaurant. The building was built for a capacity of 1,000 users and 1 million volumes. The structure consists of a steel frame and concrete slabs, and the exterior is composed of precast concrete panels that were bush-hammered for texture. Concrete was chosen as the material because concrete allowed for the most economical implementation of the special shapes required for the recessed windows and splayed reveals. The second, third, and fourth stories are connected by a monumental concrete staircase.

Since 1980, however, the state-of-the-art facilities have deteriorated. The theater was closed during the mid-1990s after water from a leaking concrete planter above the theater collapsed parts of the ceiling, but has since been renovated due to recent interest in the building. Although the restaurant was busy and successful during the early years it was closed during the late 1990s. Furthermore, the Brutalist architectural style of the library has not been widely appreciated by the public. In an effort to mute the perceived harshness of the style, the system spent $5 million to renovate the building in 2002. The money was spent on a new carpet with colorful highlights and more colorful walls. A full renovation would have cost an estimated $34 million. Nonetheless, it remained unclear as to what would happen to the Breuer building. A multi-year preservation effort led by artist, writer and historian, Max Eternity, renewed interest in the building, and the library was listed on the 2010 World Monuments Watch List of Most Endangered Sites.

In July 2016 the Fulton County Board of Commissioners unanimously voted not to demolish the library building. The library was closed in July 2018 for extensive interior and exterior renovations led by architectural firm Cooper Carry in association with Vines Architects as designers and Moody Nolan as architect of record. Within this renovation program, the addition of numerous large windows to the facade prompted strong criticism from preservationists and architects for its alteration of Breuer’s original design. Renovation work of $50 million was largely complete by February 2021. The Atlanta-Fulton Library System announced in March 2021 that the Atlanta Central Library would reopen in late summer or early fall 2021, with the official reopening in early October 2021.

References

External links

 
 Library history

1980 establishments in Georgia (U.S. state)
Brutalist architecture in Georgia (U.S. state)
Buildings and structures completed in 1980
Buildings and structures in Atlanta
Landmarks in Atlanta
Libraries established in 1980
Public libraries in Georgia (U.S. state)
Marcel Breuer buildings